Matilde Salvador Segarra (23 March 1918 – 5 October 2007) was a Spanish composer and painter.

Life
Salvador was born and raised in Castellón de la Plana, Valencian Community. She was married to the composer Vicente Asencio (1908–1979). She was a leading figure in promoting the culture and music of the Valencian Community. One of her most famous compositions was Homenatge a Mistral for solo guitar.

Matilde Salvador died of a stroke on 5 October 2007 in her native Valencia, aged 89.

Works

Piano
 1935 Campanas
 1937 Danza de la luna. (de Romance de la luna) (Fuera de catálogo)
 1937 Danza del niño mirando a la luna. (de Romance de la luna) (Fuera de catálogo)
 1946 Planyívola (Fuera de catálogo)
 1954 Judas (Fuera de catálogo)

Vocal
 1935 Canción de atardecer, para voz y piano. (de Set cançons) (Fuera de catálogo)
 1935 Cuentan que la rosa,  para voz y piano. (de Set cançons) (Fuera de catálogo)
 1935 Nana, para voz y piano. (de Vuit cançons) (Fuera de catálogo)
 1936 El amor y la llama para voz y piano. (de Set cançons) (Fuera de catálogo)
 1937 Tres cançons valencianes, para voz y piano, (Existe en versión orquestral realizada por Vicente Asencio)
 Cançó alegre
 Cançó de recança
 Cançò d’amor (Fuera de catálogo)
 1939 Alba lírica, ciclo de canciones para voz y piano (1936–1939) (De la segunda y la tercera existe versión para voz y guitarra)
 Canción, Llanto
 Canción de cuna
 Nostalgia
 Cantar de enamorada
 Alamillos verdes
 1939 Como esa agua, para voz y piano. (de Set cançons) (Fuera de catálogo)
 1939 De los álamos vengo, para voz y piano. (de Tonadas Antiguas) (Fuera de catálogo)
 1939 Seis canciones españolas, ciclo de canciones para voz y piano (de la número 4 existe versión para violín y piano, y de la número 6 versión para voz y orquesta)
 Castellana
 Gallega
 Asturiana
 Andaluza
 Zamorana
 Valenciana
 1940 ¡Adiós!, para voz y piano. (de Set cançons) (Fuera de catálogo)
 1940 Caminante, para voz y piano. (de Set cançons) (Fuera de catálogo)
 1942 El padre Lucas, para voz y piano. (de Set cançons) (Fuera de catálogo)
 1942 Set cançons, ciclo para voz y piano (1935–1942), títulos ya indicados en su año de composición (Fuera de catálogo)
 1943 Una veu, para voz y piano (Fuera de catálogo)
 1945 Ai! Que no n’era, para voz y piano. (de Tonadas Antiguas) (Fuera de catálogo)
 1945 Bona nit!, para voz y piano (de Planys, cançons i una nadala)
 1945 Cançó alegre, para voz y piano (de Planys, cançons i una nadala)
 1945 Cançó fetillera, para voz y piano (de Planys, cançons i una nadala)
 1945 Tonadas Antiguas, ciclo de tres canciones para voz y piano, títulos ya indicados en su año de composición (Fuera de catálogo)
 1945 Tres morillas, para voz y piano (de Tonadas Antiguas) (Fuera de catálogo) (Existe versión para coro a cuatro voces mixtas)
 1946 Balada para voz y piano (de Homenaje a la poesía femenina de América); existe versión para voz y orquesta
 1946 Canción de vela para voz y piano; existe versión para voz y orquesta
 1946 La loba, para voz y piano (de Homenaje a la poesía femenina de América); existe versión para voz y orquesta (de Tres nanas)
 1946 La señora luna, para voz y piano (de Homenaje a la poesía femenina de América); existe versión para voz y orquesta  (de Tres nanas)
 1946 Por los caminitos, para voz y piano (de Homenaje a la poesía femenina de América); existe versión para voz y orquesta (de Tres nanas)
 1947 Recança, para voz y piano (de Planys, cançons i una nadala)
 1947 Tres nanas, para voz y piano; títulos ya indicados en su año de composición
 1947 Cancioncilla, para voz y piano (de Cancionero de la enamorada); existe versión para voz y orquesta
 1947 Morena me llama, para voz y guitarra (de Endechas y cantares de Sepharad); existe versión para voz y piano
 1948 Arietas de Primavera ciclo de canciones para voz y piano
 1948 Baladilla del pastor para voz y piano; para voz y orquesta
 1948 Canciones de nana y desvelo ciclo para voz y piano
 Desvelo ante el agua; existe versión para voz y orquesta y para voz y guitarra
 Desvelo de la madre; existe versión para voz y orquesta
 Desvelo del mar; existe versión para voz y orquesta
 Nana de la Virgen; existe versión para voz y orquesta
 Nana del mar; existe versión para voz y orquesta y para voz y guitarra
 Nana del sueño; existe versión para voz y orquesta
 1948 El río feliz para voz y piano (de Arietas de Primavera); existe versión para voz y orquesta y para voz y guitarra
 1948 Presentimiento para voz y piano (de Cancionero de la enamorada); existe versión para voz y orquesta
 1948 Clam para voz y piano (Fuera de catálogo)
 1948 Tú entre los lirios para voz y piano y para voz y orquesta
 1948 Villancico del pescador de truchas, para voz y piano y para voz y orquesta
 1949 Ala del silenci, para voz y piano (de Aires de cançó)
 1950 Tres canciones marineras, para voz y piano
 Coplilla del marinero
 El milagro
 Yo en el fondo del mar (de Homenaje a la poesía femenina de América); existe versión para voz y orquesta
 1951 Dame la mano, para voz y piano (de Homenaje a la poesía femenina de América)
 1951 El cazador, para voz y piano (de Homenaje a la poesía femenina de América)
 1951 La barca milagrosa, para voz y piano (de Homenaje a la poesía femenina de América)
 1951 Mayo, para voz y piano (de Homenaje a la poesía femenina de América)
 1951 Seguridad, para voz y piano (Fuera de catálogo)
 1951 Vida-garfio, para voz y piano (de Homenaje a la poesía femenina de América)
 1952 En donde tejemos la ronda, para voz y piano (de Homenaje a la poesía femenina de América)
 1952 Estío seco, para voz y piano
 1954 El divino amor, para voz y piano (de Homenaje a la poesía femenina de América)
 1955 Cancionero de la enamorada, ciclo de canciones para voz y piano (1947–1955) (de los números 1 y 4 existe versión para voz y orquesta )
 Presentimiento
 Rapto
 Nostalgia
 Cancioncilla
 1955 Tonadilla y danza sefardí, para voz, piano y tabal (Fuera de catálogo)
 1955 Villancico, para voz y piano (Fuera de catálogo)
 1956 Homenaje a la poesía femenina de América, ciclo de trece canciones (1946–1956); títulos indicados en el año de composición con las versiones, si es necesario
 1956 Vidalita y danza criolla, para voz y piano (Fuera de catálogo)
 1956 Una enredadera, para voz y piano (de Homenaje a la poesía femenina de América)
 1958 Eu en ti, para voz y piano (de Canciones sobre poetas orensanos)
 1960 Endecha, para voz y guitarra (de Endechas y cantares de Sepharad); hay versión para voz y piano
 1960 Yo me levantí un lunes, para voz y guitarra (de Endechas y cantares de Sepharad); hay versión para voz y piano
 1963 A la vora, voreta, para voz y piano (de Aires de cançó)
 1963 Abans, amor, para voz y piano (de Aires de cançó)
 1963 Ara que vens, para voz y piano (de Quatre cançons)
 1963 Jo faria, para voz y piano (de Aires de cançó)
 1963 Juguem a jugar, para voz y piano (de Aires de cançó)
 1963 Per a mi la nit, Senyor, para voz y piano (de Quatre cançons)
 1963 Si algún dia vols cantar, para voz y piano (de Aires de cançó); existe versión para voz y orquesta
 1964 Aires de cançó ciclo de canciones para voz y piano (1949–1964); títulos indicados en el año de composición
 1964 Blava rosa para voz y piano (de Aires de cançó)
 1964 Cançó del xocorroc, para voz y piano (de Planys, cançons i una nadala)
 1964 Cançoneta d’abril, para voz y piano (de Planys, cançons i una nadala)
 1964 Els ulls, para voz y piano (de Quatre cançons)
 1964 Eriçó, para voz y piano (de Planys, cançons i una nadala)
 1964 Escampadissa, para voz y piano (de Quatre cançons)
 1964 Jocs d’aigua, para voz y piano (de Planys, cançons i una nadala)
 1964 Maror, para voz y piano (de Planys, cançons i una nadala)
 1964 Nadala, para voz y piano (de Planys, cançons i una nadala)
 1964 Planys, cançons i una nadala, ciclo de canciones (1945–1964) para voz y piano, títulos indicados en el año de composición
 1964 Perfum, para voz y piano (Fuera de catálogo)
 1964 Quatre cançons ciclo de canciones para voz y piano, títulos indicados en el año de composición
 1964 Recer, para voz y piano (Fuera de catálogo)
 1966 Cantiga antiga, para voz y piano (de Canciones sobre poetas orensanos)
 1966 Canciones sobre poetas orensanos ciclo de dos canciones (1958–1966) para voz y piano, títulos indicados en el año de composición
 1967 Canción del domingo, para voz y piano (de Canciones infantiles)
 1967 Canción del xilofón, para voz y piano (de Canciones infantiles)
 1967 Elefante perdido para voz y piano (de Canciones infantiles); existe versión para voz solista, coro de voces blancas, celesta, juego de timbres y piano: también hay versión para coro de voces iguales y para coro de dos voces infantiles
 1967 El ciempies descalzo, para voz y piano (de Canciones infantiles); existe versión para voz solista, coro de voces blancas, celesta, juego de timbres y piano: también hay versión para coro de voces iguales
 1967 El grillo, para voz y piano (de Canciones infantiles); existe versión para voz solista, coro de voces blancas, celesta, juego de timbres y piano: también hay versión para coro de voces iguales
 1967 El puente, para voz y piano (de Canciones infantiles); existe versión para voz solista, coro de voces blancas, celesta, juego de timbres y piano: también hay versión para coro de voces iguales
 1967 El sapo cantor, para voz y piano (de Canciones infantiles); hay versión para coro de tres voces iguales
 1967 La gallina presumida, para voz y piano (de Canciones infantiles); hay versión para coro de tres voces iguales
 1967 Sirenita, para voz y piano (de Canciones infantiles); existe versión para voz solista, coro de voces blancas, celesta, juego de timbres y piano
 1969 A la una, para voz y guitarra (de Endechas y cantares de Sepharad)
 1970 1970 Avrideme, galanica, para voz y guitarra (de Endechas y cantares de Sepharad)
 1971 Arvolicos d’almendra, para voz y guitarra (de Endechas y cantares de Sepharad)
 1971 Nana del osito, para voz y piano (de Canciones infantiles); hay versión para coro de tres voces iguales
 1971 Canciones infantiles, ciclo para voz y piano (1967–1971); títulos indicados en su año de composición
 1971 Los bilbilicos, para voz y guitarra (de Endechas y cantares de Sepharad)
 1972 Mujeres de Jerusalem, para voz y conjunto instrumental
 1973 Ecce panis angelorum, eucharistic motet for Corpus Christi for mixed choir a capella
 1974 Villancico de Las Palmas, para voz y piano; existe versión para voz y conjunto instrumental
 1975 Cervantinas, ciclo de canciones para voz y piano
 Ronda de San Juan
 Marinero soy de amor
 La inútil guarda
 Un soneto
 El papel morisco
 Villancico Trastocado
 Canto a los ojos
 Loa a Valencia
 La puerta florida
 Cantarcillo burlesco
 1979 Cantar de amanecida, para voz y guitarra (de Endechas y cantares de Sepharad)
 1979 Cantar de marinero, para voz y guitarra (de Endechas y cantares de Sepharad)
 1979 Endechas y cantares de Sepharad, ciclo de canciones para voz y guitarra (1974–1979); los títulos se indican en el año de composición
 1982 Cinc cançons de bres, ciclo de canciones para voz y piano (1945–1982)
 Les campanes
 La llar
 Mareta
 Tan tarantan
 Dorm!
 1985 Cants al capvespre, ciclo de canciones para voz y piano
 Novembre
 Paisatge nocturn
 Encara una vegada
 Vent de Ponent
 Pels camins del silenci
 Profunds meandres del no-res
 Quan m’acomiadaré de tu
 1986 Calma de mar, para voz y piano
 1986 Canturel·les de mare, ciclo de canciones para voz y piano
 Per adormir el grumet
 El moro Muça
 Ninc nanc
 La cuca fera
 El voladoret
 1986 Desig, para voz y piano
 1988 Cantilenes del Roselló, ciclo de canciones para voz y piano (1987–1988)
 El desig
 Es el maig
 La Primavera
 Els cant d’ocells
 Tres roses
 A la font gelada
 1988 Els Asfòdels, ciclo de canciones para voz y piano (1986–1988)
 Els asfòdels
 El temps
 Miratge de la tarda
 La cambra
 Enllà de l’origen
 Anhel
 Petit retaule d’amor
 1988 Per a ninar-te, para voz y piano
 1995 Ram de núvia, para voz y orquesta de cuerda; existe versión para voz y piano
 1997 Flor de taronger, para voz y orquesta de cuerda; existe versión para voz y piano
 1997 Nupcial, para voz y orquesta de cuerda; existe versión para voz y piano
 1997 L’amor Somniat, para voz y piano
 1998 Canastrell, para voz y piano

References

External links
 La Vanguardia: Matilde Salvador, leading figure of Valencian music, dies

1918 births
2007 deaths
20th-century classical composers
20th-century Spanish painters
20th-century Spanish singers
20th-century Spanish women artists
20th-century Spanish women singers
Spanish women classical composers
Women opera composers
People from Castellón de la Plana
Spanish classical composers
Composers from the Valencian Community
Painters from the Valencian Community
Singers from the Valencian Community
20th-century women composers